Appelgren is a Swedish surname.

Notable people with this surname include:
 Andreas Appelgren, Swedish ice hockey coach
 Brita Appelgren, Swedish film actress
 Chris Appelgren, American record label owner
 Frida Appelgren, Swedish music artist
 Mikael Appelgren, Swedish table tennis player
 Mikael Appelgren (handballer), Swedish handball player